Campbell County is a county in the U.S. state of Tennessee. It is located on the state's northern border in East Tennessee. As of the 2020 census, its population was 39,272. Its county seat is Jacksboro. Campbell County is included in the Knoxville metropolitan statistical area.

History
Campbell County was formed in 1806 from parts of Anderson and Claiborne Counties. It was named in honor of Colonel Arthur Campbell (1743–1811), a member of the Virginia  House of Burgesses and an officer during the American Revolutionary War.

New Mammoth Cave, located in Elk Valley, just west of Jellico, was mined for saltpeter (the main ingredient of gunpowder) during the War of 1812.  This cave possibly was also mined during the Civil War.  In 1921, the cave was developed as a tourist attraction and was open to the public until at least 1928.  Today, New Mammoth Cave is securely gated by the U.S. Fish and Wildlife Service. It is protected as a sanctuary for bats, including the federally endangered Indiana bat.

During the Civil War, the county's sympathies were predominantly with the Union.  On June 8, 1861, voters in Campbell County rejected Tennessee's Ordinance of Secession by a vote of 1,094 to 60. On August 1, 1861, Campbell County became the first Tennessee county to form a Union Army unit for the Civil War, organizing Company B of the 1st Tennessee Infantry at Jacksboro.

Geography

Campbell County is situated in a geological border region between the Cumberland Mountains in the northwest and the Appalachian Ridge-and-Valley Range in the southeast. This border area is characterized by several large, elongated ridges, namely Cross Mountain in the west and Cumberland Mountain, Walnut Mountain, and Pine Mountain to the north. Ivydale, situated in the Cumberland Mountains region, is the exact geographical center of Campbell County. Norris Lake— an artificial reservoir created by the Tennessee Valley Authority in the 1930s— is the main body of water in the region. It is fed by the Clinch and Powell Rivers, as well as several large creeks, most notably Davis Creek, Big Creek, and Cove Creek. Cove Creek also feeds the much smaller Cove Lake— a recreational lake built by TVA in the 1930s as part of the Norris project— which is located near Caryville.

Most of the county's residents live in the southern half of the county, where La Follette, Jacksboro, and Caryville are located. Jellico, located along the Tennessee-Kentucky border, is the most notable populated area in the county's plateau section.

Portions of the county north of Walnut Mountain are part of the Cumberland River watershed. Portions of the county south of Walnut Mountain are part of the Tennessee River watershed. In the northwestern part of the county, a large valley, known as Elk Valley, runs from southwest to northeast, from Pioneer to Jellico.

Adjacent counties
Whitley County, Kentucky (north)
Claiborne County (east)
Union County (southeast)
Anderson County (south)
Scott County (west)
McCreary County, Kentucky (northwest)

State-protected areas
Chuck Swan State Forest (part)
Cove Creek Wildlife Management Area
Cove Lake State Park
Cumberland Trail (part)
Indian Mountain State Park
Norris Dam State Park (part)
North Cumberland Wildlife Management Area (part)

Demographics

2020 census

As of the 2020 United States census, there were 39,272 people, 16,192 households, and 11,127 families residing in the county.

2000 census
As of the census of 2000,  39,854 people, 16,125 households, and 11,577 families were residing in the county.  The population density was 83 people/sq mi (32/km2).  The 18,527 housing units averaged 39/sq mi (15/km2).  The racial makeup of the county was 98.13% White, 0.30% African American, 0.31% Native American, 0.16% Asian,  0.20% from other races, and 0.91% from two or more races. About 0.67% of the population were Hispanics or Latinos of any race.

Of the 16,125 households, 29.80% had children under the age of 18 living with them, 55.30% were married couples living together, 12.60% had a female householder with no husband present, and 28.20% were not families. About 25.40% of all households were made up of individuals, and 11.60% had someone living alone who was 65 or older.  The average household size was 2.44, and the average family size was 2.91.

In the county, the age distribution was 22.90% under the age of 18, 8.50% from 18 to 24, 28.00% from 25 to 44, 25.50% from 45 to 64, and 15.10% who were 65 or older.  The median age was 38 years. For every 100 females, there were 93.00 males.  For every 100 females age 18 and over, there were 90.90 males.

The median income for a household in the county was $25,285, and for a family was $30,197. Males had a median income of $26,762 versus $19,138 for females. The per capita income for the county was $13,301.  About 18.40% of families and 22.80% of the population were below the poverty line, including 32.00% of those under age 18 and 17.70% of those age 65 or over.

Economy

Coal mining
The Cumberland Plateau section of Campbell County is part of the massive Appalachian coalfield that dominates much of Central Appalachia,  thus the Jellico section of the county has more in common economically with southeastern Kentucky and West Virginia, whereas the southern parts of the county economically resemble East Tennessee.  The coal seams near Jellico produced a slow-burning bituminous coal that helped make Campbell County Tennessee's largest coal-producing county in the early 20th century.

Tourism
Campbell County is home to Norris Lake and the Royal Blue Trails Complex. Much of Norris Lake is along its southern boundary, as well as several wildlife management areas such as the North Cumberland Wildlife Management Area, which includes the Royal Blue Trails. Campbell County boasts 11 marinas on Norris Lake, drawing tens of thousands of visitors annually. The county is home to Lonus Young County Park on Norris Lake and four state parks: Cove Lake State Park near Caryville, Indian Mountain State Park near Jellico, Norris Dam State Park near Rocky Top, and the Cumberland Trail State Park coursing the mountaintops overlooking LaFollette, Jacksboro, and Caryville from Speedwell in the east to the southern reaches of the county near one of the last railroad water tanks near the Shea community.  Over a million visitors frequent the Tennessee Welcome Center along I-75 at Jellico each year.

Communities

Cities
Jellico
LaFollette
Rocky Top (partial)

Towns
Caryville
Jacksboro (county seat)

Census-designated place
Fincastle

Unincorporated communities

 Alder Springs
 Anthras
 Block
 Clinchmore
 Cotula
 Duff
 Eagan
 Elk Valley
 Habersham
 Morley
 Newcomb
 Pioneer
 Royal Blue
 Stinking Creek
 Vasper
 Westbourne
 White Oak
 Wooldridge
 Wynn

Politics
Like most of East Tennessee, Campbell County has historically been a Republican stronghold. Since the founding of the Republican Party, only three Democratic Presidents, all Southerners, have carried the county. Campbell County was one of only two counties in East Tennessee won by Democrat and native Tennessean Al Gore in 2000, the other being Marion. Gore is the only losing Democrat to have ever carried the county (although he did win the national popular vote).

See also
National Register of Historic Places listings in Campbell County, Tennessee

References

External links

 Official site
 Campbell County Chamber of Commerce
 Campbell County History
 Campbell County on FamilySearch Wiki

 
1806 establishments in Tennessee
Populated places established in 1806
Counties of Appalachia
Knoxville metropolitan area
East Tennessee